Quinnia patula is a species of extremely small deep water sea snail, a marine gastropod mollusk in the family Seguenziidae.

Description
The white, thin, umbilicate, and depressed shell is markedly broader (8.35 mm) than high (5.65 mm). It is translucent nacreous.

Distribution
This marine species occurs off New Caledonia and New Zealand at depths of about 1,800 m.

References

External links
 To Encyclopedia of Life
 To World Register of Marine Species

patula
Gastropods described in 1983